The women's 500 metres races of the 2013–14 ISU Speed Skating World Cup 2, arranged in the Utah Olympic Oval, in Salt Lake City, United States, were held on November 15 and 16, 2013.

Lee Sang-hwa of South Korea won both races, breaking the world record both times. Wang Beixing of China and Heather Richardson of the United States took the silver and bronze medals in race one, while Zhang Hong of China won the Division B race.

In race two, Richardson advanced one position, taking the silver medal behind Lee, while Olga Fatkulina of Russia took the bronze. Jennifer Plate of Germany won the second Division B race.

Race 1
Race one took place on Friday, November 15, with Division B scheduled in the morning session, at 11:32, and Division A scheduled in the afternoon session, at 14:02.

Division A

Division B

Race 2
Race two took place on Saturday, November 16, with Division B scheduled in the morning session, at 09:30, and Division A scheduled in the afternoon session, at 13:32.

Division A

Division B

References

Women 0500
2